The 1937 Atlantic hurricane season was a below-average period of tropical cyclone activity in the North Atlantic, featuring eleven tropical storms; of these, four became hurricanes. One hurricane reached major hurricane intensity, equivalent to a Category 3 or higher on the modern Saffir–Simpson scale. The United States Weather Bureau defined the season as officially lasting from June 16 to October 16. Tropical cyclones that did not approach populated areas or shipping lanes, especially if they were relatively weak and of short duration, may have remained undetected. Because technologies such as satellite monitoring were not available until the 1960s, historical data on tropical cyclones from this period are often not reliable. As a result of a reanalysis project which analyzed the season in 2012, a tropical storm and a hurricane were added to the Atlantic hurricane database (HURDAT). The official intensities and tracks of all storms were also revised by the reanalysis. The year's first storm formed on July 29 in the Gulf of Mexico, and the final system, a hurricane, dissipated over open ocean on October 21.

Most of the season's storms arose from the subtropics. Nova Scotia was a focus for storm activity with four storms reaching the Canadian province as extratropical cyclones. Two of these were the remnants of hurricanes; the first inflicted $1.5 million in damage on the apple crop in the Annapolis Valley, and the second tore up four breakwaters and sank or grounded several ships. The year's deadliest tropical cyclone was a tropical storm that struck Florida at the end of August. A squall associated with the storm caused the sinking of the SS Tarpon, killing 18 people. A tropical storm striking parts of the U.S. Gulf Coast caused two deaths, but otherwise did minor damage. The season's strongest storm was estimated to have produced maximum sustained winds of and remained over the more central longitudes of the Atlantic.

The season's activity was reflected with an accumulated cyclone energy (ACE) rating of 66 units, below the 1931–1943 average of 91.2. ACE is a metric used to express the energy used by a tropical cyclone during its lifetime. Therefore, a storm with a longer duration will have high values of ACE. Thus, tropical depressions are not included here.

Timeline

Systems

Tropical Storm One 

In late July, a stationary front was draped across the northeastern Gulf of Mexico. The incipient cyclone moved steadily northeast and intensified into a tropical storm twelve hours later. It reached an initial peak of  while in the Gulf of Mexico, making landfall at that intensity near Palm Harbor, Florida, at 22:00 UTC on July 29. By 00:00 UTC on August 1, the system transitioned into an extratropical cyclone as an occluded front became attached to the circulation. It made landfall in Nova Scotia late on August 1 and curved northwest, dissipating over northern New Brunswick the next day.

In Tampa, Florida, five-minute sustained winds reached , blowing down trees, utility poles, and electric wires. Clearwater, Florida documented  of rainfall in a 24-hour period, the heaviest rains measured in connection with the passing tropical storm. Some roads were washed out in Clearwater and minor losses of fruit were documented in surrounding Pinellas County. Telephone and power service was disrupted in Halifax, Nova Scotia as the storm's remnants produced 35-mph (55 km/h) winds in the city. Three boats moored there were destroyed.

Tropical Storm Two 

On August 1, a weak trough was identified north of the Greater Antilles. It developed into a tropical depression by 18:00 UTC on August 2 while positioned just southwest of Long Island, Bahamas; further intensification into a tropical storm occurred over Current Island 24 hours later. The system curved around the western periphery of an area of high pressure, attaining peak winds of  based on data from ships that intersected the cyclone. Unlike the previous cyclone, this tropical storm never transitioned into an extratropical cyclone, instead weakening to a tropical depression around 00:00 UTC on August 9 and dissipating east of Nova Scotia twelve hours later.

Tropical Storm Three 

It intensified into a tropical storm twelve hours but remained weak for several days after as it weaved through the Bahamas. The storm began to strengthen on August 28, a trend that continued over the next 48 hours. However, based on damage reports, it is feasible the cyclone was of hurricane intensity. The tropical storm moved northwest across the Southeastern United States, weakening to a tropical depression over southern Alabama early on September 1. It degenerated into a trough over northern Arkansas by 18:00 UTC the next day.

Gusts of  impacted the coast between New Smyrna and St. Augustine. At Savannah Beach, Georgia, the bulkhead and boardwalks were damaged by strong winds. Flooding rains from the system washed out roads and bridges in the state's northwestern counties. Vessels and planes were dispatcher by the United States Coast Guard to search for and rescue survivors. Survivors remained at sea for up to 30 hours before being rescued. Rainfall totals of at least  spread as far west as eastern Mississippi, with a maximum rainfall of  observed in Vernon, Florida. Heavy rains in southeastern Alabama caused the Pea and Choctawhatchee rivers to flood, inflicting roughly $62,500 in damage to adjacent property and crops.

Hurricane Four 

The small hurricane moved steadily northwest throughout its lifespan, passing east of Bermuda before weakening to a tropical storm late the next day. It acquired well-defined frontal boundaries by 06:00 UTC on September 14, marking the system's transition into an extratropical cyclone. It made landfall in Nova Scotia and either elongated into a trough or merged with a frontal system over far eastern Canada twelve hours later.

In Nova Scotia, 600,000 barrels of apples were lost in Annapolis Valley, totaling $1.5 million in damage to that crop. Homes, barns, and other buildings suffered structural damage. Wharves and a large boat were severely damaged in Shelburne, and a schooner that ran ashore in Lockeport suffered heavy damage as well. In New Brunswick, additional homes and barns were damaged.

Tropical Storm Five 

As part of the Atlantic hurricane reanalysis project, a previously unidentified tropical cyclone was discovered in 2012. Similar to the evolution of the season's first tropical cyclone, an area of low pressure formed along a dissipating frontal boundary early on September 10. The storm moved northwest over the next day, making a close approach to the Northeastern United States before veering to the northeast. It reached peak winds of  around 18:00 UTC on September 11, when the structure of the system more resembled a subtropical cyclone than a strictly tropical one. It transitioned into an extratropical cyclone six hours later, striking Nova Scotia before becoming absorbed into the larger circulation of a non-tropical entity around 06:00 UTC on September 12.

Hurricane Six 

The system executed a gradual curve toward the north while intensifying, becoming a hurricane early on September 14. It temporarily veered east but then resumed a northward motion, remaining a potent hurricane for several days. Extratropical transition occurred by 18:00 UTC on September 19 when an occluded front became attached to the storm. It turned northeast and ultimately opened up into a sharp trough over the far northern Atlantic late on September 20.

Tropical Storm Seven 

A tropical storm formed over the Bay of Campeche by 12:00 UTC on September 16, embarking on a steady northeastward course. It briefly emerged into the far northeastern Gulf of Mexico before striking the Big Bend region of Florida as a tropical depression. The depression dissipated near Jacksonville, Florida, around 18:00 UTC on September 21.

Some small boats in St. Marks broke from their moorings and sustained slight damage. A portion of Highway 6 between Wewahitchka and White City. Two people drowned after their canoe capsized in rough seas generated by the storm near Everglades City.

Hurricane Eight 

A tropical wave likely emerged from the western coast of Africa around September 14. It developed into a tropical cyclone at some point of the next few days, with a specific date unclear in the absence of surface observations. At 06:00 UTC on September 20, a hurricane was conclusively identified about halfway between Cabo Verde and the Leeward Islands. Slight weakening occurred as the system passed well north of Bermuda. It transitioned into an extratropical cyclone by 06:00 UTC on September 26 and struck Nova Scotia before turning northeast across Newfoundland and into the northern Atlantic. The extratropical cyclone was last noted over Iceland at 12:00 UTC on September 28, after which time it likely merged with another non-tropical low.

The extratropical cyclone heavily impacted Nova Scotia, where vessels were pushed ashore, fishing gear was damaged, and trees were uprooted. In Liverpool, a boat launch and accompanying racing ships and other boats were destroyed. Three breakwaters were heavily damaged on Devils Island, in Brookland, and in Yarmouth, the second costing $80,000 to replace. A fourth breakwater at Western Head was washed away. One marine dredge was destroyed at Cape Negro and another was sunk somewhere between Lunenburg and Shelburne. Three scows en route to New Brunswick were also capsized in that area. In Port Bickerton, fishing stages, wharves, lobster traps, and nets were destroyed. A fish factory was also demolished in Halifax.

Tropical Storm Nine 

At 06:00 UTC on September 26, a tropical depression formed just north of Cuba. It intensified into a tropical storm by 18:00 UTC the following day based on reports from two ships. The extratropical cyclone continued to parallel the U.S. East Coast, eventually making landfall in Newfoundland early on September 30. It strengthened into a hurricane-force low on October 1 but ultimately dissipated two days later as it merged with another cyclone and became increasingly elongated.

Tropical Storm Ten 

In late September, a tropical wave moved westward across the Caribbean. An initial area of low pressure formed over the northwestern portion of the region on September 29, but this feature dissipated within two days. It reached peak winds of  after six hours, with steady weakening thereafter as the storm moved west-northwest and then north. The system continued to degrade once inland, dissipating after 06:00 UTC on October 4 over southeastern Arkansas.

Blue laws were suspended for half a day to allow grocery store food supplies to reach stranded areas. Damage was estimated at several thousands of dollars and the flooding was considered the city's most severe since the Great Mississippi Flood of 1927. Crops around the city sustained considerable damage. The strongest recorded winds from the tropical cyclone occurred at Port Eads, Louisiana, where a 33-mph (53 km/h) wind gust was documented as the system was developing on October 2.

Hurricane Eleven 

Similar to Tropical Storm Five, a new tropical cyclone that was not recognized in real time was found to have existed over the northern Atlantic. From October 16–17, a cold front moved eastward across the basin. An area of low pressure formed along the southern end of the dissipating boundary, initially harboring characteristics of an extratropical cyclone. The system attained peak winds of  within six hours and weakened shortly thereafter while moving west-northwest. It fell to tropical storm intensity by early on October 20; by 00:00 UTC the next day, there were no further indications of the storm. It either dissipated or was absorbed by a front encroaching from the west.

Other storms 
In addition to the eleven known tropical cyclones of at least tropical storm strength, the Atlantic hurricane reanalysis project also identified five tropical depressions. However, their marginal intensities precluded their addition to the official Atlantic hurricane track database (HURDAT). The first of these lasted from August 1–4 over the central Atlantic without affecting land, ultimately degenerating into a tropical wave. A second tropical depression developed in the Gulf of Mexico and passed near New Orleans, Louisiana, on August 29. A nearly stationary tropical depression developed in the southwestern Caribbean Sea on September 29 and dissipated two days later; it may have been absorbed by Tropical Storm Ten. This system was originally included in HURDAT as a tropical storm, but was found to have winds of only  by the reanalysis. On October 8, a northward-moving tropical depression spawned from a tropical wave well east of the Lesser Antilles, eventually transitioning into an extratropical system on October 14. The season's final tropical cyclone was a nearly stationary tropical depression that persisted in the central Caribbean Sea between October 25–29. The reanalysis project also examined eleven other disturbances from 1937 for possible tropical or subtropical cyclone characteristics, including a low-pressure system that split from a front over the open Atlantic on January 1.

Season effects 
The table below includes the duration, names, landfall(s), denoted in parentheses, damage, and death totals of all tropical cyclones in the 1937 Atlantic hurricane season. The damage and deaths associated with a tropical cyclone include both its effects as a tropical cyclone as well as its progenitor and remnants.

See also 

 List of tropical cyclones
 Atlantic hurricane season

References

External links 

 Monthly Weather Review

 
1937 meteorology
1937 natural disasters